Youssef Lemrini (born 1 January 1960 in Sale, Morocco) is a Moroccan football manager and former player.

Clubs
Mouloudia Club Lakouablia

References

Moroccan football managers
1960 births
Living people
RS Berkane managers
COD Meknès managers
Olympic Club de Safi managers